Maureen Flowers (nee Hancock)  was born on the 5th December 1946 in London.She is a retired English professional darts player and was in the 1980's, the world number-one female darts player.

Early life
Flowers grew up in Norton Green, Stoke-on-Trent. She learnt to play darts in her father's pub.

Darts career
Flowers won the Ladies National Pairs with her friend Yvonne Allen. She began competing in the Indoor League, a first for televised darts, from 1976 and later became the inaugural professional female darts player.

She won the North American Open Dart Tournament (NAODT) three years in the Ladies' Singles category: 1977, 1979 and 1981.

Twice a World Masters finalist, Flowers lost on both occasions to Ann Marie Davies in 1982 and Mandy Solomons in 1988. At the WDF World Cup in 1983, she won the Women's Pairs (with Audrey Derham) and Women's Overall events.

Sponsored by Unicorn, Flowers designed her own signature darts.

Flowers appeared on the UK television show 'Bullseye' in 1987 to score 330 for charity which was doubled to £660.

In 1988, Flowers quit professional darts. In 1996, she was entered into the National Darts Hall of Fame.

Personal life
From 1978 to 1987, Flowers was in a relationship with Eric Bristow. She was also the first manager of Bristow's protégé, Phil Taylor, during the late 1980s and early 1990s. She was married to footballer John Flowers, and by extension sister-in-law to World Cup winner Ron Flowers.

References

1946 births
Living people
English darts players
British Darts Organisation players
Sportspeople from Stoke-on-Trent
Female darts players